Albert Charles Schaeffer (13 August 1907, Belvidere, Illinois – 2 February 1957) was an American mathematician who worked on complex analysis.

Biography 
Schaeffer was the son of Albert John and Mary Plane Schaeffer (née Herrick). He studied civil engineering at the University of Wisconsin, Madison (bachelor's degree 1930) and was from 1930 to 1933 employed as a highway engineer. In 1936 he received a PhD in mathematics under Eberhard Hopf at MIT. From 1936 to 1939 he was an instructor at Purdue University. In 1939 he became an instructor at Stanford University, where he became in 1941 assistant professor, in 1943 associate professor, and in 1946 professor. From 1947 to 1950 Schaeffer was a professor at Purdue University. From 1950 to 1957 he was a professor at the University of Wisconsin, Madison, and in the academic year 1956/57 the chair of the mathematics department.

Schaeffer worked with Donald Spencer at Stanford University on variational problems of conformal mapping, e.g. coefficient ranges for schlicht functions (functions analytic and one-to-one). Specifically they worked on special cases of the Bieberbach conjecture, for which they gave a proof that the third coefficient satisfied the conjectured estimate (a result already proved by Charles Loewner). Their goal was to give a proof for the fourth coefficient, but their approach would have required the numerical integration of about one million differential equations. A little later Paul Garabedian and Max Schiffer, then at Stanford, improved the Schaeffer-Spencer method and greatly reduced the number of necessary integrations; thus Garabedian and Schiffer were able in 1955 to prove the conjectured estimate for the fourth coefficient. In 1948 Schaeffer shared the Bôcher memorial prize with Donald Spencer for their joint work on schlicht functions.

In 1931 he married Caroline Juliette Marsh; they had two sons and a daughter.

Selected publications

with G. Szegő: 
with G. E. Forsythe:  
with R. J. Duffin:

See also
Duffin–Schaeffer conjecture

References

External links

1907 births
1957 deaths
20th-century American mathematicians
Mathematical analysts
People from Belvidere, Illinois
Mathematicians from Illinois